Government General Degree College, Gopiballavpur-II, also known as Beliabera Government College, established in 2015,. is the government degree college in Jhargram district. It offers undergraduate courses in arts and science. It is affiliated to Vidyasagar University.

Departments

Arts

Bengali
English
Sociology

Science
Anthropology
Physics
Geology
Zoology

See also

References

External links
https://ggdcgopi2.ac.in/
Vidyasagar University
University Grants Commission
National Assessment and Accreditation Council

Universities and colleges in Jhargram district
Colleges affiliated to Vidyasagar University
Educational institutions established in 2015
2015 establishments in West Bengal